Kamal Anis (born 21 January 1987) is a Moroccan footballer. He usually plays as midfielder.

References

1987 births
Living people
Footballers from Casablanca
Moroccan footballers
Raja CA players
Wydad de Fès players
Botola players
Association football midfielders